Varun Raymond Aaron (born 29 October 1989) is an Indian cricketer from Jamshedpur. A right-arm fast bowler, he first played for Jharkhand U-19 followed by Jharkhand Ranji team. He played his first One Day International (ODI) for India in October 2011 and made his Test debut the following month.

Domestic career
Aaron took 13 wickets in the 2010–11 Ranji Trophy and bowled a  delivery. He was part of the India Emerging Players squad that went to Australia in 2011, and after impressing there earned a call-up to the India ODI squad for the series in England. He was part of the India Emerging Players squad that went to Australia in 2011, and after impressing there earned a call-up to the Indian T20 and ODI squad for the series in England as a replacement for Ishant Sharma.

In September 2014, he was signed by the Durham County Cricket Club for the 2014 County Championship.

In February 2017, he was bought by the Kings XI Punjab team for the 2017 Indian Premier League for 2.8 crores. In October 2018, he was named in India B's squad for the 2018–19 Deodhar Trophy.

In December 2018, he was bought by the Rajasthan Royals in the player auction for the 2019 Indian Premier League.

In August 2019, he was named in the India Red team's squad for the 2019–20 Duleep Trophy. In February 2022, he was bought by the Gujarat Titans in the auction for the 2022 Indian Premier League tournament.

International career

ODI career
Aaron only bowled 3 overs in his second match against England at Eden gardens and took 1 wicket (again bowled) of Alastair Cook which proved to be a key strike for India.

On 25 January 2014, Aaron made his international comeback after 2 years, having previously suffered from a back injury. He returned figures of 1/52.

References

External links
 Varun Aaron's profile page on Wisden
 
 Varun Aaron - IPL Profile from RoyalChallengers
 
 Varun Aaron's name on Jain University Website

1989 births
Living people
Indian cricketers
Jharkhand cricketers
Royal Challengers Bangalore cricketers
Kolkata Knight Riders cricketers
Delhi Capitals cricketers
Rajasthan Royals cricketers
India Test cricketers
India One Day International cricketers
East Zone cricketers
People from Jamshedpur
Cricketers from Jharkhand
Leicestershire cricketers
Gujarat Titans cricketers